Shorkot–Sheikhupura Branch Line is one of several branch lines in Pakistan, operated and maintained by Pakistan Railways. The line begins from Shorkot Cantonment Junction station and ends at Qila Sheikhupura Junction. There are 13 railway stations from Shorkot Junction to Qila Sheikhupura Junction.

History
The Shorkot–Sheikhupura Branch Line was originally named as the Shorekot Road-Chichoki Railway as part of the North Western State Railway. Surveying for the railway line began in 1906 while construction began in 1907 and ended in 1911.

Stations
 Shorkot Cantonment Junction
 Naim Ishfaq Shahid Halt
 Pir Mahal
 Kamalia
 Mamu Kanjan
 Kanjwani
 Rahme Shah
 Chak Ibrahim Bhatti
 Tandliawala
 Chak Turan
 Jhok Ditta
 Rurala Road
 Jaranwala Junction
 Kot Daya Kishen railway station.
 Buchiana
 Nankana Sahib
 Warburton
 Bahuman
 Qila Sheikhupura Junction

References

Railway stations on Shorkot–Sheikhupura line
Railway lines opened in 1911
5 ft 6 in gauge railways in Pakistan